The George W. Morton House is a property in Nolensville, Tennessee, United States, that was listed on the National Register of Historic Places in 1988.  It was built c.1870.

The property's eligibility for NRHP listing was addressed in a 1988 study of Williamson County historical resources.

The site was relocated in Nolensville on February 4, 2019, after which time it was removed from the National Register.

See also
Samuel S. Morton House, also NRHP-listed in Williamson County

References

Houses on the National Register of Historic Places in Tennessee
Houses in Williamson County, Tennessee
Houses completed in 1870
National Register of Historic Places in Williamson County, Tennessee